FC Lokomotiv Mezdra (ФК Локомотив Мездра) is a Bulgarian football club from the town of Mezdra, which currently playing in the Third League, the third tier of Bulgarian football. The club's home ground is the Lokomotiv Stadium in Mezdra, with a capacity of 5,000. Team colours are red and black. The club's nickname is "The Irons from Mezdra", due to the city of Mezdra's connections with the railroad industry.

The club was originally founded in 1945. Lokomotiv saw little success for the majority of its history, usually competing in the second or third tiers of Bulgarian football. In 2008, the team achieved a historic first promotion to the A Group, (now known as First League). Lokomotiv Mezdra managed to survive two seasons in the elite, before suffering relegation after the 2009-10 season. In the following years, financial problems overwhelmed the club, forcing its folding in 2012. The team was re-founded in 2016, starting from the regional amateur fourth tier.

History

1945–2007
PFC Lokomotiv Mezdra was founded in 1945, under the name Iron sport club. The team, nicknamed The irons from Mezdra, counts 20 participations in the second division, and the best success in Bulgarian Cup is a quarter-final in 1945–46.

2007–2012: NADIN ownership and promotion to the elite
The turning point in the history of the club was in 2007. The company NADIN bought the club, and almost all of its players were released and a significant number of valuable players were signed. The team won the second division without difficulty, finishing more than 10 points ahead of the second team in the table and qualifying for the top flight for the first time in its history.

In the first year in the top division, Lokomotiv's owner decided to bring players with a lot of experience in the Bulgarian football, his first signing being ex-Levski Sofia's Saša Simonović, who arrived from Slavia Sofia for free. Radostin Stanev, Iliya Iliev and Strati Iliev were just a few players who soon followed, as the club also signed seven imports – Portuguese David Silva, Rui Miguel and Fausto, Serbian Zoran Cvetković, Austrian Milan Janković, Greek Aristeidis Lottas and Jiří Lenko from Czech Republic. The team coach was Viktorio Pavlov. The first top flight game was against Spartak Varna, a 0–2 loss. After the match, Pavlov decided to resign and Georgi Todorov was named in his place. In their first season in A Group, Lokomotiv eventually finished in 8th place, a success for a newcomer in the league.

Their second season in the elite was less successful, and was marked by inconsistency on and off the pitch. Lokomotiv Mezdra eventually finished 14th, suffering relegation after two years of top flight football. 

The club was dissolved in early August 2012 after suffering from big financial debts.  Two new clubs was founded in Mezdra – Lokomotiv 1929 in 2011 and Lokomotiv 2012 in 2012. Neither was really seen as a true and legitimate successor, and both eventually folded shortly after their founding.

2016–present: Refounding
The club was refounded in 2016, under the name FC Lokomotiv Mezdra, after the finantional failing of both Lokomotov 2012 and Lokomotiv 1929. In 2018, the new team managed to win the regional league of Vratsa and promoted to the Third League.

Honours

Domestic
Bulgarian A PFG
8th place 2008–09
Bulgarian Cup
 Twice 1/8 finalist 1946 and 2009–10

European 
 European Railways Cup Winners (1): 2003

Current squad

Past seasons

Most games with the club
1. 267 –  Atanas Atanasov
2. 246 –  Milcho Gergov
3. 210 –  Bonko Raykov

Most goals with the club
1. 83 –  Georgi Yashov
2. 66 –  Atanas Atanasov
3. 42 –  Vladimir Hinkov

Notable players
 Tsvetan Genkov (born 8 August 1984 in Mezdra, Genkov began his career in Lokomotiv at the age of seventeen, previously having been an athlete. For Lokomotiv he played 84 matches and scored 41 goals)

References

External links
  Official website
bgclubs.eu

Football clubs in Bulgaria
Association football clubs established in 1945
Association football clubs established in 2016
1945 establishments in Bulgaria
2016 establishments in Bulgaria
Mezdra
Mezdra